IP Group plc is a British-based Intellectual property business investing in technology companies, based in London, England. It is listed on the London Stock Exchange and is a constituent of the FTSE 250 Index.

History
The business was founded in 2001 and floated on the Alternative Investment Market in 2003 before achieving a full listing in 2006: it raised an additional £55m in June 2011. It acquired Fusion IP Group on 20 March 2014.

Operations
The company specialises in the commercialisation of university intellectual property rights.

References

External links
 Official site

British companies established in 2001
Business services companies established in 2001
Companies based in the City of London
Companies listed on the London Stock Exchange
Innovation in the United Kingdom